Hatta Assembly constituency is one of the 230 Vidhan Sabha (Legislative Assembly) constituencies of Madhya Pradesh state in central India. This constituency came into existence in 1951, as one of the Vidhan Sabha constituencies of Madhya Pradesh state. This constituency is reserved for the candidates belonging to the Scheduled castes since 2008, following delimitation of the legislative assembly constituencies.

Overview
Hatta (constituency number 57) is one of the 4 Vidhan Sabha constituencies located in Damoh district. This constituency covers the entire Hatta and Patera tehsils, Hindoria nagar panchayat and part of Damoh tehsil of the district.

Hatta is part of Damoh Lok Sabha constituency along with seven other Vidhan Sabha segments, namely, Pathariya, Jabera and Damoh in this district, Deori, Rehli and Banda in Sagar district and Malhara in Chhatarpur district.

Members of Legislative Assembly
 1951: Kadora, Indian National Congress / Premshankar Laxmishankar Dhagat, Indian National Congress
 1957: Kadora, Indian National Congress / Gaya Prasad, Indian National Congress
 1962: Jugal Kishore Bajaj, Independent
 1967: Jugal Kishore Bajaj, Indian National Congress
 1972: Kunjbiharilal Manmohanlal, Indian National Congress
 1977: Ramkrishna Kusmaria, Janata Party
 1980: Snehsalila Hazari, Indian National Congress (I)
 1985: Ramkrishna Kusmaria, Bharatiya Janata Party
 1990: Ramkrishna Kusmaria, Bharatiya Janata Party]
 1993: Vijay Singh, Bharatiya Janata Party
 1998: Raja Pateria, Indian National Congress
 2003: Gangaram Patel, Bharatiya Janata Party
 2008: Umadevi Khateek, Bharatiya Janata Party
 2013: Umadevi Khateek, Bharatiya Janata Party

See also
 Hatta
 Hindoria

References

Damoh district
Assembly constituencies of Madhya Pradesh